Osbornodon iamonensis is an extinct species of hesperocyonine, a predecessor of modern dogs that were endemic to North America and which lived from the Oligocene to Early Miocene epoch 23.6—16.3 Ma and existed for approximately . It was named for Lake Iamonia in northern Florida. Fossils have been found in Florida and Nebraska. In the Thomas Farm Site in Gilchrist County, Florida, it is the most common carnivore found in that area.

References

R. M. Nowak. 1991. Walker's Mammals of the World. Maryland, Johns Hopkins University Press (edited volume) II (K. Behrensmeyer/K. Behrensmeyer/J. Alroy)
Wang, X. 2003. New Material of Osbornodon from the Early Hemingfordian of Nebraska and Florida. Bulletin of the American Museum of Natural History, 279:163-176.

Hesperocyonines
Oligocene canids
Miocene carnivorans
Oligocene mammals of North America
Miocene mammals of North America
Paleontology in Florida
Paleogene Florida
Neogene Florida
Rupelian species first appearances
Aquitanian species extinctions